Smilets reigned as tsar of Bulgaria from 1292 to 1298.

Life
Although Smilets is credited with being descended "from the noblest family of the Bulgarians", his antecedents are completely unknown. Judging by the landholdings of Smilets’ brothers Radoslav and Vojsil, the family held extensive lands between the Balkan mountains and Sredna Gora.

Before ascending the throne replacing  George I in 1292, Smilets had married daughter of the sebastokratōr Constantine Palaiologos, a half-brother of Emperor Michael VIII Palaiologos. Apart from the information that Smilets became emperor of Bulgaria according to the wishes of Nogai Khan, we know nothing of the circumstances of Smilec's accession. Smilets was crowned by Patriarch Joachim III. Joachim  was executed for treason in 1300 by emperor Theodore Svetoslav, George I's son, and historian John Van Antwerp Fine Jr. theorizes that the alleged treachery might be linked to the obscure period when Smilets overthrew George Terter I.

The reign of Smilets has been considered the height of Mongol overlordship in Bulgaria. Nevertheless, Mongol raids may have continued, as in 1297 and 1298. Since these raids pillaged parts of Thrace (then entirely in Byzantine hands), perhaps Bulgaria was not one of their objectives. In fact, in spite of the usually pro-Byzantine policy of Nogai, Smilets was quickly involved in an unsuccessful war against the Byzantine Empire at the beginning of his reign.

About 1296/1297 Smilets married his daughter Theodora to the future Serbian King Stefan Dečanski, and this union produced Serbian king Stefan Dušan.

In 1298 Smilets disappears from the pages of history, apparently after the beginning of Chaka's invasion. Smilets may have been killed by Chaka or died of natural causes while the enemy advanced against him. Smilets was briefly succeeded by his son Ivan II.

Smilets Point in Antarctica is named after Smilets of Bulgaria.

Family
Smilec was married to an unnamed Byzantine princess, daughter of sebastokratōr Constantine Palaiologos. She was called just Smiltsena (the wife of Smilets). By her he had at least three children:
 Ivan II, who succeeded as emperor of Bulgaria 1298–1299/1300
 Teodora of Bulgaria, Queen of Serbia
 Marina

References

Sources

External links
Detailed list of Bulgarian rulers

13th-century births
1298 deaths
13th-century Bulgarian emperors
Eastern Orthodox monarchs
Bulgarian people of the Byzantine–Bulgarian Wars
Smilets dynasty